Stéphane Breton (Lévis, Québec) is a Canadian actor. He graduated from the Conservatoire d'art dramatique de Montréal in 1996.

Filmography

He has appeared in various TV series including:
 Smash (TV series) (as Martial the trainer of François)
 2 frères (Michel Guilbert)
 Mon meilleur ennemi (Michel Lebeau)
 Les Invincibles (Martin)
 Dans une galaxie près de chez vous (Extraterrestre mâle)
In film he has appeared in:
 Le Petit ciel (2000), 
 Québec-Montréal (2002)
 Red Nose (Nez rouge) (2003). 
 Il était une fois dans le trouble in the role of Réal 
 The Happiness of Others (Le Bonheur des autres) in 2011 as Yves
 French Kiss
 Camion 2012 directed by Rafaël Ouellet
 Mimine - 2021

References

Living people
Year of birth missing (living people)
Canadian male film actors
Canadian male television actors
Male actors from Quebec
People from Lévis, Quebec
20th-century Canadian male actors
21st-century Canadian male actors